João Soares da Mota Neto (born 21 November 1980), also known as Mota, is a Brazilian football striker who last played for Ferroviário.

Career
Mota began his career with Ceará Sporting Club in 1998, then went to play for Spanish side RCD Mallorca B from 1999 to 2001. He was suspended by the club in April 2001 after a Royal Spanish Football Federation investigation into the veracity of his Portuguese passport that he was using to work in the European Union; he said that he was entitled to it due to having a Portuguese great-grandmother. He was banned for a year by Spain's Court of Sport, which found that he obtained the passport illegally in 1998.

Mota then went back to Brazil and played for Cruzeiro Esporte Clube scoring 32 goals in the league. In 2004, he went to the Far East where he played for South Korean professional league, K-League side Chunnam Dragons, finishing as the league's top scorer with 14 goals.

In early 2005, Mota joined Portuguese giant Sporting Lisbon. However, he could not make the same impact, and Mota returned to K-League in July. He now plays for Seongnam Ilhwa Chunma. His agent, since his move from Ceará to Cruzeiro in 2003, is Emerson Damasceno, from Brazil.

As soon as he moved on to Seongnam Ilhwa Chunma he became the best player for his club, scoring 7 goals in 19 matches. However, he suffered from a broken left ankle in the match against Gyeongnam FC in 2006, which forced him to be out of the pitch for several months.
He then came back from injury at the time of Play-off season, and scored the winning goal against FC Seoul in semi-final,
and two goals in the final against Suwon Samsung Bluewings.

On 26 March 2009, Mota signed with Ceará until the end of the season, helping Ceará to be promoted to first division in Brazil.

On 28 December 2009, Mota came back to South Korea and joined Pohang Steelers. After spending a two-year at Pohang, he returned to Brazil for his family.

In January 2012, Mota signed with Ceará Sporting Club, where he played for the third time in his career.

Honors

Club
Seongnam Ilhwa Chunma
 K-League
 Champions : 2006
 Runners-up : 2007, 2009
 Korean FA Cup Runners-up : 2009
 K-League Cup Runners-up : 2006

Individual
 AFC Champions League Top Scorer : 2007
 K-League Top Scorer : 2004
 K-League Best XI : 2004

References

External links
Mota at Sambafoot
CBF 

1980 births
Living people
Sportspeople from Fortaleza
Brazilian footballers
Campeonato Brasileiro Série A players
Campeonato Brasileiro Série B players
Ceará Sporting Club players
Brazilian expatriate footballers
Expatriate footballers in Spain
RCD Mallorca B players
Cruzeiro Esporte Clube players
Clube Atlético Bragantino players
Brazilian expatriate sportspeople in South Korea
Expatriate footballers in South Korea
K League 1 players
Jeonnam Dragons players
Seongnam FC players
Pohang Steelers players
Brazilian expatriate sportspeople in Portugal
Expatriate footballers in Portugal
Primeira Liga players
Sporting CP footballers
Association football forwards